Matthew Robertson (born March 9, 2001) is a Canadian professional ice hockey defenseman who is currently playing with the Hartford Wolf Pack in the American Hockey League (AHL) as a prospect for the New York Rangers of the National Hockey League (NHL). He was selected by the Rangers in the 2nd round of the 2019 NHL Draft with the 49th overall pick.

Playing career

Junior
Robertson played junior hockey for the Edmonton Oil Kings of the Western Hockey League from 2017 through 2021.  He was selected by Edmonton in the 2016 WHL Bantam Draft with the 7th overall selection.  He played 7 games for Edmonton in the 2016-17 season where he got to be a teammate of his older brother Tyler Robertson, who played forward with the Oil Kings.  In his first full season with Edmonton, 2017–18, he played in 67 games and had 7 goals and 17 assists but a -18 plus minus rating.  Robertson played for Team Canada in the 2018 Hlinka Gretzky Cup and won a gold medal while scoring 2 goals and 2 assists in 5 games.  Robertson missed 6 games early in Edmonton's 2018-19 season with a concussion but ended up playing 52 games with 7 goals and 26 assists and improved his plus minus rating to +18.

Going into the 2019 NHL Entry Draft Robertson was projected by many draft prognosticators as a possible first round draft choice.  He was ranked 26th among North American skaters by the NHL Central Scouting Bureau.  He ended up being drafted by the Rangers in the 2nd round with the 49th overall pick.  Robertson said of being drafted "Just hearing my name get called, it’s a dream I’ve had since a little kid. It’s a surreal experience just going through it."  USA Today writer Vincent Mercogliano immediately rated Robertson as the Rangers' 10th best prospect.

Robertson returned to Edmonton for the 2019-20 season. He played 60 games scoring 13 goals and 34 assists with a +5 plus minus rating.  After the season Mercogliano increased his rating to being the Rangers' 7th best prospect.  In the COVID-19 shortened 2020-21 season, Robertson played 22 games for Edmonton, scoring at a point-per-game pace with 4 goals and 18 assists with a +26 plus minus rating.  Oil Kings' assistant coach Luke Pierce noticed an improvement in his play, saying "He turned a corner where he really started to buy into feedback and having an open dialogue and conversations about his game. That’s where we really thought he started to takeoff."  Pierce also said "He was mean. He was hard to play against. He really did start to play like a guy the size that he is with how quickly he can end plays and transition pucks."  He was named a WHL Eastern Conference Second Team All-Star and Defenseman of the Year in the Eastern Conference's Central Division.  Mercogliano named him the Rangers' 6th best prospect.

Professional
Robertson played for the Rangers' minor league affiliate, the Hartford Wolf Pack, in 2021-22.  He scored 1 goal and had 10 assists in 65 games.  He spent some time with the Rangers on their COVID-related taxi squad during the season but did not get into any games for the Rangers.  After the season Mercogliano named him the Rangers' 4th best prospect.  Robertson said of the experience that "I learned a lot. On the defensive side – positioning, angles, just little things to be more efficient. … On the offensive side, just getting shots through, knowing when to jump up and get into little pockets. I simplified my game."  Rangers director of player development Jed Ortmeyer said "He had a great year, his first pro year, full year. He made some big strides. He played really well for us in Hartford. He’s a great defenseman, he moves well and he’s big. It wasn’t much of an adjustment for him in pro hockey. We’re excited about seeing how big of a summer he has. He got a taste of NHL playoffs being a black ace. Just a lot of momentum going forward for him."

Robertson started the 2022-23 preseason with the Rangers but was assigned to the Hartford Wolf Pack before the season began.

Playing style
One of Robertson's attributes is his size, with a 6 foot, 4 inch frame.  In 2019, The Hockey News writer Ryan Kennedy said that although he provides some offense "it’s his hockey sense and defensive positioning that has scouts excited."  After the 2019-20 season, Edmonton Oil King coach Brad Lauer said that "His strength, for me watching him play, is his ability to skate. He can skate the puck out of traffic. He can jump in on the rush and be in that second wave of attack."  Rangers' general manager said at the time that "We're really happy with the pick [of Robertson in the 2019 draft]. We definitely feel like he has a lot of the tools you need to have success in the NHL.

Ortmeyer said of Robertson in 2021 that "His foot in the door, I think, will potentially be that he’s responsible defensively. With this skating ability and his offensive upside, that's only going to make his transition out of his own zone easier – making that first pass and being able to skate the puck out of trouble. But obviously, you’ve got to defend first to play in the NHL, and we think that he can do that."  In 2022 Ortmeyer said "He’s a big body that moves really well. He's a guy that can chew up 20, 25 minutes of ice time and just make the sound, smart play. If he uses his body and his reach, he can be a really sound defenseman."  Wolf Pack assistant coach Casey Torres said "He’s got that physical presence. He does do a very good job of ending plays in the defensive zone, like that’s a really good skill set for him."

In 2021 Robertson described himself as "a defenseman who tries to focus a little more on the defensive side, but loves to jump up in the play."  In 2022, The Hockey News writer Tony Ferrari praised his "quick decisions, precise execution, and...solid all-around game" as well as his "passing ability on the breakout."

Career statistics

Regular season and playoffs

References

External links

2001 births
Living people
Canadian ice hockey defencemen
Edmonton Oil Kings players
Hartford Wolf Pack players
New York Rangers draft picks
Ice hockey people from Edmonton